The Slider is the seventh studio album by English rock band T. Rex, and the third since abbreviating their name from Tyrannosaurus Rex.  It was released on 21 July 1972 by record labels EMI and Reprise. Two number-one singles, "Telegram Sam" and "Metal Guru", were released to promote the album. Issued at the height of the band's popularity, The Slider received acclaim from critics, and reached number 4 in the UK charts and number 17 in the US.

Recording and production 

On the recommendation of Elton John, The Slider was recorded outside of Paris at Château d'Hérouville to avoid British taxing laws. Production started in March 1972 and the basic recordings were completed in Strawberry Studios in five days. One of the songs recorded at Chateau was "Metal Guru". Bolan described the song as a "festival of life song", and that he related "Metal Guru" to "all gods around... someone special, a godhead. I thought how god would be, he'd be all alone without a telephone".

Further recording was done at the end of March in Rosenberg Studios in Copenhagen, Denmark. The backing vocals by Flo & Eddie were recorded at Elektra Studios in Los Angeles, in April.

Like all previous T. Rex albums, The Slider was produced by Tony Visconti.

Album cover 

The album notes credit Ringo Starr with the front and back cover photographs. The photographs were taken the same day that Starr was filming the T. Rex documentary Born to Boogie at John Lennon's estate, Tittenhurst Park. Producer Tony Visconti, however, disputes that Starr took the photograph, stating "Marc [Bolan] handed me his motorized Nikon and asked me to fire off two rolls of black and white film while we were on the set of Born to Boogie. Ringo, the director of the film, was busy all day lining up shots. But Marc apparently saw a photo credit opportunity and gave Ringo the credit for the photos."

The iconic grainy image of the cover is in no small part a result of how the film was actually processed. The film from the Born to Boogie shoot was couriered to Robert Horner Photography in Kensington. The task of processing the film fell to a young darkroom technician who, encouraged by his love of T. Rex, stayed on to develop the four rolls of black and white 35mm film. Anxious to see if they really were of T. Rex, the developing chemical,  Kodak D76, was heated to a far higher than recommended temperature, shortening the processing time. However, the stop bath chemical, used to prevent the film from developing further prior to fixation, remained at the lower regular temperature. This action resulted in some reticulation of the film emulsion adding a subtle but rather interesting effect to this cover image.

Release 

Two singles were released to promote The Slider. The first was "Telegram Sam" which was released January 1972 and charted in the United Kingdom for twelve weeks and peaked at number 1. "Telegram Sam" also charted in the United States and peaked at 67 on the Pop Singles chart. The second single was "Metal Guru" which was released in May 1972 and charted in the United Kingdom for fourteen weeks and peaked at number 1. It did not chart in the United States.

The Slider was released on 21 July 1972 by record labels EMI in the UK and Reprise in the US. It entered the United Kingdom charts on 5 August 1972 where it stayed for eighteen weeks, peaking at number 4. In the United States, where the album was promoted upon release with a television commercial featuring the band miming to "Chariot Choogle", it peaked at number 17 on the Billboard 200 chart.

Reissues 
The Slider was reissued in the UK in 1985 on the Marc On Wax label. All non-album tracks released in 1972 were included on a bonus disc (bonus tracks on the CD version). A Japanese CD release on SMS records dating to 1986 uses the same track list but a different mastering. Later CD releases on Teldec and Relativity omitted the bonus tracks.
The Slider was remastered again for CD by Edsel Records in 1994 as part of their extensive T. Rex reissue campaign and a number of different bonus tracks were appended. A companion release, entitled Rabbit Fighter (The Alternate Slider), was released in 1995 and contained alternative versions and radio sessions of the main album and bonus tracks. A combined CD digipak of these releases was issued in 2002. Also in 2002, further recordings from the Slider sessions were released by Thunderwing Productions Limited (TPL), the owners of several original ¼", 1" and 2" Master Tape recordings of Marc Bolan and T. Rex. These tracks were released as The Slider Recordings. In 2010, The Slider was remastered and reissued by Fat Possum Records. The remastering was done by Chicago Mastering.

In 2012, the 40th Anniversary re-issue came out, a new remaster by producer Visconti, including B-sides, outtakes and an unheard demo of the title track taken from Visconti’s private collection. The set contained two CDs  and a 180g pressing of the newly remastered album. In addition the three singles also got vinyl pressings. A DVD was also included with a 105 minute interview with Visconti along with archive interview clips and TV footage.

Reception 

From contemporary reviews, Richard Williams of The Times reviewed the album alongside Rod Stewart's Never A Dull Moment and David Bowie's The Rise and Fall of Ziggy Stardust and the Spiders from Mars and Roxy Music's Roxy Music. Williams found Bolan to be  "the least obviously talented".  Williams found that the  "narrow range and musical repetitiousness" of the music did not matter as it made "his records immediately recognizable on the radio." and that the album "is full of songs of a slightness which is wondrous to behold. But the hushed intimacy of Bolan's vocal delivery helps to make one word do the work of ten — particularly when combined with his gift of coining oddly appealing images." Williams also praised the work of Tony Visconti, declaring "I'm inclined to think that it's Visconti more than anyone who's responsible for Bolan's success; his arrangements and production give T. Rex's work a quality which the group's leader could never have achieved alone." Ben Edmonds of Creem felt that after "Telegram Sam" and "Metal Guru" that "there isn't another single on the album." Edmonds found the other tracks on the album "kind of bumps along from track to track [...] The rest of the material is nice but kinda lackluster, and Bolan isn't helped much by a terribly ordinary rhythm section and Mickey Finn's non-existent percussion. If you aren't already a T. Rex fanatic, then The Slider isn't going to do very much about making you one." Loraine Alterman of The New York Times commented on the lyrics that would "undoubtedly sound quite profound to 14-year-old ears" and that "it's a long, long way from Bolan's 'Ballrooms of Mars' to Yeats' 'Byzantium'." Alterman concluded that "even to ears successfully past puberty, Mr, Bolan does have a certain fey charm that in the end defies analysis."

In his retrospective review, Steve Huey of AllMusic wrote, "Even if it treads largely the same ground as Electric Warrior, The Slider is flawlessly executed, and every bit the classic that its predecessor is." Andy Beta of Pitchfork gave the album a 9.5/10 grade, and wrote that the album "marked both the zenith and imminent approach of the cliff’s edge for T. Rextasy. Recorded in a dilapidated castle in France, it captured Marc Bolan as the King of Glam at the absolute height of his powers." LA Weekly  praised the album as "a hauntingly unique masterpiece"

Legacy 
Johnny Marr of the Smiths cited it as one of his favourite albums, saying: "The Slider came out and it had 'Metal Guru' on it. It was a song that changed my life as I had never heard anything so beautiful and so strange, but yet so catchy. 'Telegram Sam' was also on that album and the whole thing was unusually spooky and had a weird atmosphere, considering it was a number one record and they were essentially a teenybop band". Gary Numan also hailed it among his favourites: "Song after song after song… and the title track; it's a not typical album-title track. You'd normally go for one of the big singles and The Sliders got a very slow, lazy groove thing. It's just great. It's just the sexiest track".

"Ballrooms of Mars" was featured in the 2003 comedy film School of Rock, and was used as the opening theme of the Spanish TV series Punta Escarlata. "Ballrooms of Mars" also appeared in the 2013 film Dallas Buyers Club. The lyrics of the song "Baby Boomerang" became a plot element in a 1973 episode of Cannon, "The Hard Rock Roller Coaster."

Track listing

Personnel 

 Marc Bolan – vocals, guitar
 Steve Currie – bass guitar
 Mickey Finn – percussion, vocals
 Bill Legend – drums
 Mark Volman ("Flo") – background vocals
 Howard Kaylan ("Eddie") – background vocals
 Tony Visconti – string arrangements, background vocals

 Technical

 Tony Visconti – producer
 Ringo Starr – sleeve photography
 Dominique Freddy Hansson – engineering
 David Katz – orchestra master
 Mick O'Halloran – Front of house Technician/ Lead road manager 
 Steve Little    - Stage Manager/ PA to Marc/Roadie
 Micky Marmalade-Roadie/Driver

Charts

Weekly charts

Year-end charts

References 

 Sources

External links 
 

1972 albums
T. Rex (band) albums
EMI Records albums
Albums arranged by Tony Visconti
Albums produced by Tony Visconti